Nico Carrillo is a British kickboxer. He is the current WMO Welterweight World Champion, WMO Super Welterweight World Champion and ISKA Muay Thai World 65 kg Champion.

Biography and Career
Carrillo started combat sport training with boxing before discovering Muay Thai at the age of 15 at the Glasgow Thai Boxing Academy.

On 26 March 2016 Carrillo faced Paul Barbour at a Muay Thai Boxing event. Carrillo won by unanimous decision.

On 2 December 2017 Carrillo faced Shane Farqharson at Victory Promotions. He won the fight by fourth round knockout with a body shot. Carrillo was unable to compete during the year 2018 due to recurring injuries.

Carrillo was scheduled to face Kenny Hong in Sweden on 31 August 2019 at Lion Fight 59. At this occasion Carrillo would decide to pursue a full time fighting career. Carrillo won by unanimous decision.

On 12 February 2021 Carrillo traveled to Dubai for the UAM event where he defeated Muhammadi Jahongir by unanimous decision.

On 24 July 2021 Carillo faced Mo Abduraham at Combat Fight Series 5 for the ISKA Muay Thai Intercontinental 65 kg title. Carrillo won the fight by technical knockout in the fourth round.

On 24 October 2021 Carrillo faced Jack Kennedy at the Supershowdown 10th Anniversary event in Bolton, England. He won by first round knockout.

On 21 December 2022 Carillo faced Dani Molero for the WBC Muay Thai European Welterweight title. He won the fight by third round technical knockout on advice of the ringside doctor due the multiple cuts on his opponent's face.

On 26 March 2022 Carrillo faced Jeremy monteiro for the vacant ISKA Muay Thai World 65 kg title at the Combat Fight Series 7 event. Carrillo won the fight by unanimous decision to capture the title.

Titles and achievements

Professional
International Sport Kickboxing Association
 2021 ISKA Muay Thai Intercontinental -65 kg Champion
 2022 ISKA Muay Thai World 65 kg Champion

International Combat Organisation
 2019 ICO European -65 kg Champion

World Boxing Council Muay Thai
 2021 WBC Muay Thai European Welterweight Champion

World Muaythai Organization
 2022 WMO World Super Welterweight (154 lbs) Champion
 2023 WMO World Welterweight (147 lbs) Champion

Fight record

|-  style="text-align:center; background:#cfc;"
| 2023-03-04|| Win ||align=left| Pasquale Amoroso || SuperShowDown|| Bolton, England || Decision (Unanimous) ||5 ||3:00
|-
! style=background:white colspan=9 |

|-  style="text-align:center; background:#cfc;"
| 2022-11-12|| Win ||align=left| Alessio Malatesta  || SuperShowDown || Bolton, England || Decision (unanimous) || 5||3:00
|-
! style=background:white colspan=9 |

|-  style="background:#cfc;"
| 2022-04-23||Win ||align=left| Saeksan Or. Kwanmuang|| Siam Warriors || Cork City, Ireland || Decision (unanimous) || 5||3:00

|-  style="text-align:center; background:#cfc;"
| 2022-03-26|| Win ||align=left| Jeremy Monteiro || Combat Fight Series 7|| Croydon, England || Decision (unanimous) || 5 || 3:00  
|-
! style=background:white colspan=9 |

|-  style="text-align:center; background:#cfc;"
| 2021-12-18 || Win ||align=left| Dani Molero || MASDA Fight Night || Liverpool, England || TKO (Doctor stoppage) || 3 ||  
|-
! style=background:white colspan=9 |

|-  style="text-align:center; background:#cfc;"
| 2021-10-24 || Win ||align=left| Jack Kennedy|| Supershowdown|| Bolton, England || KO (Left hook + Right cross) || 1 ||

|-  style="text-align:center; background:#cfc;"
| 2021-07-24 || Win ||align=left| Mo Abdurahman || Combat Fight Series 5 || London, England || TKO (Punches & elbows) || 4 || 1:28  
|-
! style=background:white colspan=9 |

|-  style="text-align:center; background:#cfc;"
| 2021-02-12 || Win ||align=left| Muhammadi Jahongir || UAM || Dubai, United Arab Emirates || Decision (Unanimous) || 5 || 3:00

|-  style="text-align:center; background:#cfc;"
| 2019-12-07 || Win ||align=left| Gorka Caro || VICTORY 5|| Gateshead , England || KO (Left hook to the body) || 1 || 2:36   
|-
! style=background:white colspan=9 |

|-  style="text-align:center; background:#cfc;"
| 2019-08-31 || Win ||align=left| Kenny Hong || Lion Fight 59 || Gothenburg, Sweden || Decision  || 3 || 3:00

|-  style="text-align:center; background:#cfc;"
| 2019-06-29 || Win ||align=left| Joao Francisco || Blitz 6 || England || Decision (Unanimous) || 3 || 3:00

|-  style="text-align:center; background:#fbb;"
| 2019-04-27 || Loss ||align=left| Mikkel Lund || Mikenta Fight Night|| Copenhagen, Denmark || KO (Left hook to the body) || 2 ||

|-  style="text-align:center; background:#cfc;"
| 2019-03-30 || Win ||align=left| Alex Dass Rey || Evo Thai Boxing Series || Glasgow, Scotland || Decision (Uannimous) || 5 || 3:00

|-  style="text-align:center; background:#cfc;"
| 2017-12-02 || Win ||align=left| Shane Farqharson || Victory Promotions || Gateshead, England || KO (Left hook to the body) || 4 || 1:40

|-  style="text-align:center; background:#cfc;"
| 2017-10-21 || Win ||align=left| Angelo Pizarro || Ultimate Muay Thai 5 ||United Kingdom || KO (High kick)||  ||

|-  style="text-align:center; background:#cfc;"
| 2017-04-29 || Win ||align=left| Patryk Sagan || Power of Scotland 24|| Paisley, Renfrewshire, Scotland ||   ||  ||

|-  style="text-align:center; background:#fbb;"
| 2017-07-01 || Loss ||align=left| George Mouzakitis || Blitz 4 || United Kingdom || Decision  || 5 || 3:00

|-  style="text-align:center; background:#cfc;"
| 2016-10-08 || Win ||align=left| Dylan O’hanlon || Ultimate Muay Thai 3 || Paisley, Renfrewshire, Scotland || Decision (Unanimous) || 5 || 3:00

|-  style="text-align:center; background:#cfc;"
| 2016-06-25 || Win ||align=left|  || Blitz 3|| United Kingdom || KO (Low kick)  ||  ||

|-  style="text-align:center; background:#cfc;"
| 2016-03-26 || Win ||align=left| Paul Barbour || Muay Thai Boxing|| Linwood, Renfrewshire, Scotland || Decision (Unanimous)|| 5 ||3:00

|-
| colspan=9 | Legend:

References 

Scottish Muay Thai practitioners
1997 births
Living people